MEI may refer to:

Education 
 MEI Academy, an international school
 Mathematics in Education and Industry, an examination board affiliated with the OCR examination board
 Mennonite Educational Institute, an independent grades K-12 school in Abbotsford, British Columbia

Businesses 
 MEI (company), manufacturer of cash handling systems
 Matsushita Electric Industrial Co., Ltd.
 Micro Electronics, Inc.
 Member of the Energy Institute (MEI)
 , an annual conference of Italian independent record labels

Government 
 Ministry of Economy and Innovation, the Portuguese economy ministry
 Middle East Institute
 Marginal efficiency of investment or internal rate of return, a relationship between interest rate and amount of investment that can be profitable at a given time
 Meridian Regional Airport
 Montreal Economic Institute
 Meridian (Amtrak station), Amtrak station code MEI, Mississippi, United States
 Medicare Economic Index

Military
 MEI Hellhound (Grenade), low velocity multipurpose grenade
 MEI Mercury, a family of grenades developed by Martin Electronics, Inc.

Science 
 Iodomethane (methyl iodide, MeI), a halomethane
 Multivariate ENSO index
 4-Methylimidazole (4-MEI), a chemical compound

Technology 
 Management Engine Interface, a component of Intel Active Management Technology
 Music Encoding Initiative, a music encoding format

Other uses
 Media and Entertainment International, a former global union federation
 OECD Main Economic Indicators, a monthly publication of the Organisation for Economic Co-operation and Development

See also
 Mei (disambiguation)